Frayed is an original novella written by Tara Samms (a pseudonym for Stephen Cole) and based on the long-running British science fiction television series Doctor Who.  It features the First Doctor and Susan. It was released both as a standard edition hardback and a deluxe edition featuring a frontispiece by Chris Moore. Both editions have a foreword by Stephen Laws.

External links
The Cloister Library - Frayed

Reviews
Frayed reviews at Infinity Plus

2003 British novels
2003 science fiction novels
Doctor Who novellas
British science fiction novels
Novels by Stephen Cole
Telos Publishing books